Songs About Me is the seventh studio album by American country music artist Trace Adkins. It was released on March 22, 2005, via Capitol Records Nashville. His highest-selling album to date, it has been certified 2× Platinum by the RIAA and had sold 1.5 million copies. Singles from this album include the title track, "Arlington", and "Honky Tonk Badonkadonk". The title track and "Honky Tonk Badonkadonk" both went to No.2 and "Arlington" went to No.16 on the U.S. BillboardHot Country Songs charts. "Honky Tonk Badonkadonk" was also a Top 40 hit on the Billboard Hot 100 and Pop 100 charts as well.

The track "Metropolis" was originally recorded by Anthony Smith on his 2003 album If That Ain't Country, and Sammy Kershaw on his 2003 album I Want My Money Back.

Track listing

Personnel
Trace Adkins - lead vocals
Larry Beaird - acoustic guitar
Bruce Bouton - dobro, pedal steel guitar
Mike Brignardello - bass guitar
Pat Buchanan - electric guitar
Tom Bukovac - electric guitar
Perry Coleman - background vocals
J. T. Corenflos - electric guitar
Eric Darken - percussion
Chip Davis - background vocals
Paul Franklin - dobro, pedal steel guitar, lap steel guitar
Aubrey Haynie - fiddle, mandolin
Wes Hightower - background vocals
Dann Huff - electric guitar, soloist
Jeff King - electric guitar
Liana Manis - background vocals
Brent Mason - electric guitar
Greg Morrow - percussion, drums
Gordon Mote - synthesizer, piano, Hammond organ
Nashville String Machine - strings
Steve Nathan - piano, keyboards, Hammond organ
Mickey Raphael - harmonica
John Wesley Ryles - background vocals
Scotty Sanders - pedal steel guitar
Michael Spriggs - acoustic guitar
DeWayne Strobel - electric guitar
Bryan Sutton - acoustic guitar, banjo, mandolin
Bobby Terry - acoustic guitar, electric guitar, resonator guitar
Dennis Wilson - background vocals
Lonnie Wilson - drums
Jonathan Yudkin - fiddle, mandolin

Chart performance
Songs About Me was a No.1 album on the US Billboard Top Country Albums chart for the week of April 9–15, 2005. It became a No.11 one on the U.S. Billboard 200 that same year.

Weekly charts

Year-end charts

Singles

Certifications

References

2005 albums
Albums produced by Scott Hendricks
Trace Adkins albums
Capitol Records albums